San Jacinto Tlacotepec  is a town and municipality in Oaxaca in south-western Mexico. The municipality covers an area of 233.5 km². 
It is part of the Sola de Vega District in the Sierra Sur Region.

As of 2005, the municipality had a total population of 2145.

The local language, Zenzontepec Chatino, is also spoken in the municipality of Santa Cruz Zenzontepec and in the former municipality of Santa María Tlapanalquiahuitl.

References

Municipalities of Oaxaca